The 2010 Silverstone Formula Two round was the first round of the 2010 FIA Formula Two Championship season. It was held on 18 August 2009 at the old configuration of the Silverstone Circuit in Northamptonshire, England. Pole position for first race was secured by Jolyon Palmer. Philipp Eng set his fastest lap in second qualifying.

Classification

Qualifying 1

Qualifying 2

Race 1

Race 2

Standings after the race
Drivers' Championship standings

References

FIA Formula Two Championship